Stickies may refer to:

 A shortened form of sticky notes
 Stickies (Apple), a Macintosh note-taking application
 Sticky Notes, a Windows digital sticky notes utility
 Stickies (papermaking), tacky substances that causes deposits in papermaking, especially in deinking
 Stickies, nickname of the Official Irish Republican Army
 Stickies, Australian nickname for dessert wines
 Euphenism for cum shot

See also 
 Sticky (disambiguation)